is a former Japanese football player.

Playing career
Noguchi was born in Sakai, Ibaraki on February 25, 1972. After graduating from Komazawa University, he joined Kyoto Purple Sanga in 1994. He became a regular player from first season and he played many matches as right and left side back for a long time. However he could hardly play in the match in 2002. In 2003, he moved to Omiya Ardija. He played many matches and retired end of 2003 season.

Club statistics

References

External links

kyotosangadc

1972 births
Living people
Komazawa University alumni
Association football people from Ibaraki Prefecture
Japanese footballers
J1 League players
J2 League players
Japan Football League (1992–1998) players
Kyoto Sanga FC players
Omiya Ardija players
Association football defenders